Sucre is a town in the Manabí province of Ecuador.  The town owes its name to Marshal Antonio José de Sucre.

Sources 
World-Gazetteer.com

See also 
Antonio José de Sucre
Sucre Canton

Populated places in Manabí Province